Syrian diaspora refers to Syrian people and their descendants who chose or were forced to emigrate from Syria and now reside in other countries as immigrants, or as refugees of the Syrian Civil War.

The number of Syrians outside Syria is estimated to be from 8 to 13 million, nearly half of the country's population. The UNHCR reports that 4.9 million global refugees in 2015 were Syrian nationals. The Syrian nationality law does not grant diaspora Syrians an automatic right of return to Syria, and under the controversial 2018 Absentees Law, the Assad government confiscated property of millions of Syrians.

Populations

See also
Lebanese diaspora
List of Syrian refugee camps in Jordan
Little Syria, Manhattan
Refugees of the Syrian Civil War
Refugees of the Syrian Civil War in Jordan
Syrians in Lebanon
Syrian refugee camps

References

External links
Syrian diaspora at Flickr Commons